|}

The Prix Noailles is a Group 3 flat horse race in France open to three-year-old thoroughbred colts and fillies. It is run over a distance of 2,100 metres (about 1 mile and 2½ furlongs) at Longchamp in April.

History
The event was established in 1878, and it was originally called the Prix du Nabob. It was named after The Nabob, a leading sire in France. Its distance was 2,500 metres.

The Prix du Nabob was one of several trials for the Prix du Jockey Club collectively known as the Poules des Produits. The others (listed by their modern titles) were the Prix Daru, the Prix Lupin, the Prix Hocquart and the Prix Greffulhe. The Prix du Nabob was restricted to the produce of mares covered by stallions born outside France. It was funded by entries submitted before a horse's birth, in the year of conception.

The race was renamed in memory of Alfred de Noailles (1823–1895), a member of the Société d'Encouragement, in 1896. Noailles played an important role in the creation of Longchamp Racecourse.

The Prix Noailles was cut to 2,400 metres in 1902. It was abandoned throughout World War I, with no running from 1915 to 1919.

The race was cancelled once during World War II, in 1940. For a period it merged with the Prix Daru. The combined event, the Prix Daru-Noailles, was run over 2,150 metres at Le Tremblay in 1943. It was run over 2,100 metres at Maisons-Laffitte in 1944 and 1945, and at Longchamp in 1946.

In the post-war years, the Prix Noailles was contested over 2,200 metres. It was cut to 2,100 metres in 2005. It was shortened to 2,000 metres in 2011, and reverted to 2,100 metres in 2012. In 2014 it was downgraded from Group 2 to Group 3.

Twelve winners of the race have achieved victory in the Prix du Jockey Club. The first was Zut in 1879, and the most recent was Anabaa Blue in 2001.

Records
Leading jockey (6 wins):
 Freddy Head – Goodly (1969), Dragoon (1970), Val de l'Orne (1975), Lydian (1981), Nerio (1988), Grand Plaisir (1992)

Leading trainer (13 wins):
 André Fabre – Jeu de Paille (1983), Cariellor (1984), Dancehall (1989), Fort Wood (1993), Walk on Mix (1995), Fragrant Mix (1997), Slickly (1999), Gentlewave (2006), Grand Vent (2011), Tableaux (2013), Soleil Marin (2017), Slalom (2019), Junko (2022)

Leading owner (4 wins):
 Marcel Boussac – Irismond (1924), Pharis (1939), Giafar (1947), Faublas (1953)
 Guy de Rothschild – Diatome (1965), Premier Violon (1966), Luthier (1968), Jeu de Paille (1983)

Winners since 1978

Earlier winners

 1878: Clementine
 1879: Zut
 1880: Pacific
 1881: Forum
 1882: Cimier
 1883: Vernet
 1884: Pi Ouit
 1885: Aida
 1886: Verdiere
 1887: Gournay
 1888: Walter Scott
 1889: Achille
 1890: Alicante
 1891: Primrose
 1892: Saint Michel
 1893: Chapeau Chinois
 1894: Ravioli
 1895: Cherbourg
 1896: Riposte
 1897: Flacon
 1898: Le Guide
 1899: Maurice
 1900: Royal
 1901: Tibere
 1902: Glacier
 1903: Quo Vadis
 1904: Ajax
 1905: Jardy
 1906: Querido
 1907: La Serqueuse
 1908: Souvigny
 1909: Aveu
 1910: Aloes III
 1911: Combourg
 1912: Imperial
 1913: Vulcain
 1914: Durbar
 1915–19: no race
 1920: Pendennis
 1921: Meisonnier
 1922: Kibar
 1923: Grand Guignol
 1924: Irismond
 1925: Red Hawk
 1926: Biribi
 1927: Fenimore Cooper
 1928: Le Correge
 1929: Dark Times
 1930: Chateau Bouscaut
 1931: Brasik
 1932: Bosphore
 1933: Bengal
 1934: Zenodore
 1935: Bouillon
 1936: Fastnet
 1937: Actor
 1938: Anchois
 1939: Pharis
 1940: no race
 1941: Nepenthe
 1942: Arcot
 1943: Norseman
 1944: Prince Bio
 1945: His Eminence
 1946: Prince Chevalier
 1947: Giafar
 1948: Flush Royal
 1949: Rancio
 1950: Lacaduv
 1951: Thelus
 1952: Corindon
 1953: Faublas
 1954: Le Grand Bi
 1955: Vimy
 1956: Tanerko
 1957: Weeping Willow
 1958: Noelor
 1959: Cousu d'Or
 1960: Le Ventoux
 1961: Match
 1962: Val de Loir
 1963: Calchaqui
 1964: Le Fabuleux
 1965: Diatome
 1966: Premier Violon
 1967: Roi Dagobert
 1968: Luthier
 1969: Goodly
 1970: Dragoon
 1971: Maryambre
 1972: Sancy
 1973: Eddystone
 1974: D'Arras
 1975: Val de l'Orne
 1976: Twig Moss
 1977: Catus

* The race was merged with the Prix Daru from 1943 to 1946.

See also
 List of French flat horse races
 Recurring sporting events established in 1878 – the Prix Noailles is included under its original title, Prix du Nabob.

References

 France Galop / Racing Post:
 galop.courses-france.com:
 1878–1889, 1890–1919, 1920–1949, 1950–1979, 1980–present
 france-galop.com – A Brief History: Prix Noailles.
 galopp-sieger.de – Prix Noailles (ex Prix du Nabob).
 ifhonline.org – International Federation of Horseracing Authorities – Prix Noailles (2019).
 pedigreequery.com – Prix Noailles – Longchamp.

Flat horse races for three-year-olds
Longchamp Racecourse
Horse races in France